The Theban tomb TT12 is located in Dra' Abu el-Naga', part of the Theban Necropolis, on the west bank of the Nile, opposite to Luxor. It is the burial place of the ancient Egyptian Hery, who was Overseer of the Granary of the King's Mother Ahhotep, during the reigns of Seqenenre Tao II to Amenhotep I.

The tomb is located near to TT11, connected to it by a third tomb, TT399.

Hery (also written as Hray) was the son of a lady named Ahmose. A son named Ahmose is shown offering to his father. Other children are shown including daughters Bakamun and Tjentnub and another son named Amenmes.

See also
 List of Theban tombs

References

Theban tombs